Keir Bettley (born 17 August 1984) is a New Zealand cricketer. He played in one first-class match for Northern Districts in 2010.

See also
 List of Northern Districts representative cricketers

References

External links
 

1984 births
Living people
New Zealand cricketers
Northern Districts cricketers
Cricketers from Hamilton, New Zealand